is BoA's fifth single. It was featured on the hit anime, Inuyasha, as the fourth (in Japan) and the second (Korean) ending theme song. This was released on the same day as her Japanese debut album Listen to My Heart and reached number ten on the Oricon singles chart. Also, The Korean version of this song listed in her Korean album, Miracle.

This single was also the first Copy Control release in Japan.

Track listing
 Every Heart: Minna no Kimochi
 Every Heart (English Version)
 Listen to My Heart (Ken Harada's TB-Bassin' Remix)
 Every Heart: Minna no Kimochi (Instrumental)

Charts

References

2002 singles
2002 songs
2000s ballads
BoA songs
Inuyasha songs
Pop ballads
Torch songs